Paul Bonno (born 29 January 1954) is a French former cyclist. He competed in the team pursuit event at the 1976 Summer Olympics.

References

External links
 

1954 births
Living people
French male cyclists
Olympic cyclists of France
Cyclists at the 1976 Summer Olympics
French track cyclists
Place of birth missing (living people)